The Kapalikulangara Sree Mahavishnu Temple is located in Taliparamba, Kannur district, Kerala, India, near the Sree Rajarajeshwara temple.

See also
Rajarajeshwara temple
Trichambaram Temple

External links
 https://www.google.co.in/maps/dir/12.053227,75.3558437/Kapalikulangara+Sree+Mahavishnu+Temple,+Taliparamba,+Kerala+670141/@12.0541016,75.3528304,21z/data=!4m17!1m7!3m6!1s0x3ba4400edae7f801:0xa0d6671e79188175!2sKapalikulangara+Sree+Mahavishnu+Temple,+Taliparamba,+Kerala+670141!3b1!8m2!3d12.0524151!4d75.3564759!4m8!1m1!4e1!1m5!1m1!1s0x3ba4400edae7f801:0xa0d6671e79188175!2m2!1d75.3564759!2d12.0524151?hl=en

Hindu temples in Kannur district